Cornelia Popa (née Popescu; born 27 August 1950) is a Romanian athlete. She competed in the women's high jump at the 1972, 1976 and the 1980 Summer Olympics.

References

External links
 
 

1950 births
Living people
Athletes (track and field) at the 1968 Summer Olympics
Athletes (track and field) at the 1972 Summer Olympics
Athletes (track and field) at the 1976 Summer Olympics
Athletes (track and field) at the 1980 Summer Olympics
Romanian female high jumpers
Romanian pentathletes
Olympic athletes of Romania
Place of birth missing (living people)
Universiade silver medalists for Romania
Universiade medalists in athletics (track and field)